María Elisa Camargo (born in Guayaquil, Ecuador) is an Ecuadorian actress and activist. She started out as a contestant on The X Factor Colombia. She began appearing in musical telenovelas after studying theatre as a child. Her first leading part in a Latin American film, Maria Alegria for Mark of Desire (Telefutura/Univision), resulted from this.

Camargo's international acting career took off when she relocated to Mexico; she landed numerous villain roles in Televisa's primetime programs. She received an invitation to compete as a star in Univision's Mira Quien Baila and was named one of the "50 Most Beautiful" by People en Espaol.

She was hired by Telemundo to be their primetime star, and her show broke all previous records for the network, defeating Univision. With Ozuna as her co-star in the Dominican film Los Leones, Camargo's career has transitioned to the silver screen. She went to Los Angeles lately and received her first American acting opportunity as a guest actor for Cinemax's Warrior. She also acted in the Dominican film Infatuation.

She played the character of Patricia Teheran in the Colombian telenovela Tarde lo conocí. She also appeared in Bajo el mismo cielo (as Adela Morales, the star in the series). She starred in Telemundo's hit show En otra piel as a double character: Mónica Serrano and Adriana Aguilar. Her last participation with Telemundo was on the series El Barón, where she starred as Isabel.

Career
Camargo tried out for Colombia's version of The X Factor, El factor X in 2005. Under Jose Gaviria's direction, she entered the main program after several months of bootcamp and auditions. She played music by Shakira, David Bisbal, and Lara Fabian.

Following El Factor X, Camargo made appearances on a number of RCN shows before being cast as Natalia in the telenovela Floricienta. She was cast as Mary Joy in the telenovela La Marca del Deseo (The Mark of Desire), starring Stephanie Cayo and Alfonso Baptista, after Floricienta. La Marca del Deseo, a program produced by RCN for Univision, was her debut appearance on American television.

Alongside Dulce María, she took part in the 2009 version of Verano del '98 (Endless Summer), titled Verano de amor (Summer of Love), in which she portrays Isabella Roca, the antagonist of the narrative. In the film Hasta Que el Dinero Nos Separe (For Love or Money), she also portrayed Monica Ledesma.

She played Kristel Ruiz y de Teresa Curiel, one of the antagonists in the 2010 telenovela Llena de Amor (Fill Me With Love), against Altair Jarabo and Azela Robinson. She played Patricia "Patricia Zorrilla" in the 2013 film Porque el Amor Manda (Because Love rules).

She co-starred with Gregorio Pernia, Carolina Gaitán, Geraldine Zivic, Pedro Palacio, Indhira Serrano, Roberto Manrique, Norkys Batista in the Telemundo serial Flor Salvaje (Wild Flower) in 2011.

In 2013, she portrayed "Natalie" in Beto Gomez-directed Mexican film Flying Low.

She co-starred in the 2014 Telemundo telenovela En Otra Piel (Part of Me) as the protagonist alongside David Chocarro, Jorge Luis Pila, Vanessa Villela and Laura Flores. She was cast as the lead in Bajo el mismo cielo (Under the same sky), a Telemundo telenovela that also starred Gabriel Porras, Erika de la Rosa, Luis Ernesto Franco and Julio Bracho, in the 2015–2016 season.

She starred in the Telemundo telenovela Bajo el Mismo Cielo between 2015–2016, which set a record for Telemundo by outperforming Univisión in the 9–pm primetime slot.

She sang live vocals while portraying the vallenato legend Patricia Teheran in the 2017 Caracol bio-series Tarde Lo Conoc. She and Roberto Manrique both appeared in the Ecuadorian movie Thin Walls.

In 2018, she starred as Isabel Garcia, the wife of aspiring drug king Nacho Montero, in Telemundo's superseries El Barón. She additionally took part in the HBO Access short film Unimundo.

In 2019, In Caribbean Cinemas/Bou Group film Los Leones, she costarred with Ozuna and Clarissa Molina as "Elvira," the deranged psychologist. Additionally, she won her first American part as Marisol Rooker in the HBO/Cinemax Warrior guest appearance.

She portrayed "Valeria Garza" also known as "El Sin Nombre" in the 2022 video game Call of Duty: Modern Warfare II. Her character is a Mexican drug lord and the head of the Las Almas Cartel.

Filmography

Discography

Awards and nominations

Accolades

References 

Living people
People from Guayaquil
21st-century Ecuadorian women singers
Ecuadorian telenovela actresses
Ecuadorian people of Colombian descent
1985 births